"Mr. Monk and the End" is the two-part series finale of the USA Network original criminal mystery dramedy television series, Monk. It is the fifteenth and sixteenth episodes of the eighth and final season, and is the 124th and 125th episodes in the series overall. Adrian Monk (Tony Shalhoub) finally discovers his wife Trudy's (Melora Hardin) murderer after twelve years of searching, concluding a seven-year, eight-season long arc. When "Part 2" aired, it set a series high and a new viewership record for the most watched episode of a regular drama series ever in basic cable with 9.4 million viewers. Both parts were written by series creator Andy Breckman and directed by Randy Zisk.

Plot 
In a flashback to December 14, 1997, Trudy Monk asks her husband about his latest investigation, the disappearance of a midwife named Wendy Stroud. Monk and Captain Stottlemeyer question Dr. Malcolm Nash, director of the birthing center where Stroud worked. Stottlemeyer receives a phone call and informs Monk that Trudy has been killed.

In the present day, Monk finds that his latest case is taking him back to the same birthing clinic. Although Stottlemeyer offers Monk the chance to sit the case out, he insists he is okay. The pair learn that Dr. Nash had been shot dead while digitizing patient records. Monk concludes that the murder was committed by a professional hitman, and the police soon find a partial fingerprint that identifies the suspect as Joey Kazarinski. Seeking a warrant for his arrest from Judge Ethan Rickover, the group overhear Rickover telling his wife that he will never move out of his house, learning that he has been nominated for the State Supreme Court. That night, Kazarinski's employer instructs him to kill Monk.

When attending a dinner the following day at Natalie's house, Monk is poisoned with a powerful synthetic toxin based on ricin. Stottlemeyer forms a task force to find out who hired the hitman to kill Dr. Nash and what poison was used on Monk. The group track down Kazarinski to a train station, only for him to be hit by a freight train and killed.

Monk discovers a videotape recording made by Trudy before her death, where she confesses to having had an affair with Rickover when he had been a law professor at Berkeley. The affair resulted in a child, which only lived for a few minutes. Trudy suspected that Rickover might be silencing everyone who knew about the affair, so she made the video just in case. Monk remembers the conversation between Rickover and his wife about his house and deduces that a crucial clue is connected to it.

Natalie realizes that the poison was planted in Monk's hand wipes; the hospital is given this information to make an antidote.

Monk goes to Rickover's house and forces Rickover to dig up the remains of the missing midwife. Rickover admits he committed the murders in order to ensure that he would get the position of appellate judge. Twelve years ago, Wendy Stroud, the nurse who delivered the child, told Rickover she intended to tell the press about his affair with Trudy and their child, forcing him to kill her and bury her in his front yard, which explains why he refused to move. Rickover also killed Trudy, as she was the only person who could connect Stroud's disappearance to him. Twelve years later, Dr. Nash came across references to the child when digitizing the birthing clinic's patient records, and thus suspected what had happened to Stroud. He then tried to blackmail Rickover, causing Rickover to hire Kazarinski to kill him and poison Monk so he wouldn't be able to piece everything together. Rickover steals Monk's gun and commits suicide.

A few days later, Monk finds an old newspaper article concerning Stroud's disappearance, and discovers that Trudy's child did not die, but was adopted. Stottlemeyer tracks her down. Monk meets Trudy's daughter, Molly Evans, who bears a striking resemblance to Trudy and, much like her mother, is a writer, working as a film critic for a local paper.

Reception

Critical reception
"Mr. Monk and the End" has received generally positive reviews. Allison Waldman of TvSquad called the cliffhanger at the end of "Part 1" great and said that she was "dying to know how [it would be] resolved". She also praised Tony Shalhoub's acting in the bed scene in which he talks to Trudy. Waldman called the drama "tense" in "Part 2", and praised Shalhoub and Craig T. Nelson's acting. Jonah Krakow of IGN had mixed feelings about the finale, saying that Molly's introduction was a nice way to send the show off, although he felt cheated that the show's biggest mystery was literally handed to Monk in a box. Like Waldman, he praised Shalhoub's and Nelson's acting, and the tension of their scene in which Nelson digs up the midwife's body. Overall he gave it an 8 out of 10.  The A.V. Club Emily VanDerWerff called it "a surprisingly sweet ending to a show that I haven't watched regularly in a few years", and gave it a "B+".

Ratings
"Part 1" gained 5.8 million viewers. "Part 2" set various records in television history, with 9.4 million viewers. It was the series high (previously set by the prior season's finale "Mr. Monk Fights City Hall"), USA Network's most-watched scripted television show (previously set by Burn Notice), and basic cable's most-watched hour-long drama (previously set by The Closer with 9.2 million viewers).

Awards and nominations
Tony Shalhoub was nominated for the 2010 Primetime Emmy Award for Outstanding Lead Actor in a Comedy Series for this episode.  Additionally, Randy Newman won the 2010 Primetime Emmy Award for Original Outstanding Music and Lyrics for the song "When I'm Gone".

References

Monk (TV series) episodes
American Christmas television episodes
American television series finales
2009 American television episodes